This is a list of World War I flying aces from British India.
 

 Captain Lawrence Coombes, born in Madras, garnered 15 aerial victories as a Sopwith Camel pilot for the Royal Naval Air Service and the Royal Air Force.
 Captain Maurice Douglas Guest Scott was credited with 12 aerial victories flying as both observer and pilot.
 Captain (later Squadron Leader) Edward Dawson Atkinson,of the Indian Army, was credited with 10 aerial victories in two combat tours, one while flying a Nieuport and another flying a Royal Aircraft Factory S.E.5a.
 Captain Indra Lal Roy was credited with 10 aerial victories, within two weeks in July 1918, while piloting a Royal Aircraft Factory S.E.5a in No. 40 Squadron RAF. He is the only Indian ace of the war.
 Captain (later Group Captain) Arthur Peck of No. 111 Squadron RFC was credited with eight aerial victories.
 Captain Douglas Carbery scored six confirmed aerial victories while serving as an aerial observer in various squadrons.
 Lieutenant Thomas Cecil Silwood Tuffield had six aerial victories confirmed while flying as an observer in 48 Squadron's Bristol F.2 Fighters.
 Captain George M. Cox scored five aerial victories as a Sopwith Camel pilot for No. 65 Squadron RAF.

References
Notes

Bibliography
 
 
 

India
World War I flying aces
World War I flying aces